The Changsha Museum is a history museum located at Beichen Delta in Kaifu District, Changsha, Hunan, China. It is adjacent to the Changsha Concert Hall, Changsha Planning Exhibition Hall and Changsha Library.

History
Changsha Museum was constructed in 2015.

Collections
The collections include Bronzes of Shang and Zhou dynasties, Chinese ceramics, and cultural relic of Changsha.

Public access
Changsha Museum open to visitors for free.

Changsha Museum is closed on Mondays, and is open from 9:00 am to 17:00 pm daily.

Nearby attractions include the Changsha Concert Hall, Changsha Planning Exhibition Hall and Changsha Library.

Transportation
 Take subway Line 1 to get off at Beichen Delta Station

 Take bus No. 11 or 106 to Liangguan Yiting Bus Stop

References

External links

Museums in Hunan
Museums established in 2015
2015 establishments in China
Buildings and structures in Changsha
Tourist attractions in Changsha
Kaifu District, Changsha